Winfred Mutile Yavi (born 31 December 1999) is a Kenyan-born Bahraini female athlete who specialises in the 3000 metres steeplechase. Born in Kenya, she transferred her allegiance to the oil-rich Middle Eastern state at the age of fifteen, becoming eligible to compete for her adopted nation in August 2016. She represented Bahrain at the 2017 World Championships in Athletics at the age of seventeen and finished eighth in the steeplechase final in a personal best time of 9:22.67.

International competitions

References

External links

Living people
1999 births
Kenyan female steeplechase runners
Bahraini female steeplechase runners
World Athletics Championships athletes for Bahrain
Kenyan emigrants to Bahrain
Naturalized citizens of Bahrain
Athletes (track and field) at the 2018 Asian Games
Asian Games gold medalists for Bahrain
Asian Games medalists in athletics (track and field)
Medalists at the 2018 Asian Games
Asian Athletics Championships winners
Asian Games gold medalists in athletics (track and field)
Athletes (track and field) at the 2020 Summer Olympics
Olympic athletes of Bahrain
Islamic Solidarity Games medalists in athletics